The 1994 Badminton World Cup was the sixteenth edition of an international tournament Badminton World Cup. The event was held in Ho Chi Minh City, Vietnam in 1994 with a total prize money of US$170,000. Indonesia won both the singles event with women's doubles while Malaysia won Men's doubles and cross country pair from Denmark & Sweden won the mixed doubles.

Medalists

Men's singles

Finals

Women's singles

Finals

Men's doubles

Finals

Women's doubles

Finals

Mixed doubles

Finals

References 
 
https://www.myheritage.com/research/record-10450-9612770/canberra-times-act-aug-9-1994?snippet=6d5a0f674f1b68d044b5f1d744eb71e8

Badminton World Cup
1994 in badminton
1994 in Vietnamese sport
Sport in Ho Chi Minh City
International sports competitions hosted by Vietnam